Choltice is name of several locations in the Czech Republic:

Choltice (Pardubice District), a market town in the Pardubice Region
Choltice, a local part of Litultovice in the Moravian-Silesian Region